Tung Lo Wan is a village in the Tai Wai area of Sha Tin District, Hong Kong.

Location
Tung Lo Wan village is located east of Mei Lam Estate, across the Tai Wai Nullah.

Administration
Tung Lo Wan is a recognised village under the New Territories Small House Policy.

History
Tung Lo Wan was historically a Hakka village occupied by families of different surnames, the Yau being the majority. The first generation of the Tse clan who settled in the village moved to Tung Lo Wan in the early 20th century.

Features
The Tse Ancestral Hall, also called Tse Po Shu Tong, was built before 1910. It is the only ancestral hall in the village. The Li Cottage, located nearby, at the corner of Tung Lo Wan Hill Road and Chung Ling Road, was built around 1918. It is connected by a path to the Li Tomb uphill.

See also
 Kau Yeuk (Sha Tin)

References

External links

 Delineation of area of existing village Tung Lo Wan (Sha Tin) for election of resident representative (2019 to 2022)

Villages in Sha Tin District, Hong Kong
Tai Wai